Mehdi Khalsi (born June 6, 1986 in Casablanca) is a Moroccan amateur boxer who competed at the 2008 and 2012 Olympics at welterweight (69 kg).

At the 2008 Summer Olympics he lost in his debut to Dilshod Mahmudov 3-11.

At the 2012 African Boxing Olympic Qualification Tournament he qualified again at the same weightclass. At the 2012 Summer Olympics (results) he again lost in his first fight to  Yasuhiro Suzuki, 13:14.

References

External links
Yahoo

1986 births
Sportspeople from Casablanca
Olympic boxers of Morocco
Living people
Welterweight boxers
Boxers at the 2008 Summer Olympics
Boxers at the 2012 Summer Olympics
Moroccan male boxers
21st-century Moroccan people
20th-century Moroccan people